The Ministry of Foreign Affairs of the Republic of Slovenia (Slovene: Ministrstvo za zunanje zadeve Republike Slovenije; MZZ) is an executive department of the Government of Slovenia responsible for relations with other countries and international organisations, monitoring of the international political and economic situation, and strengthening of Slovenia's relations with other countries and international organisations.

The ministry is located in the capital city of Ljubljana.

The current Minister of Foreign Affairs, Tanja Fajon, has served since 1 June 2022.

Organization

Executive 
The Chief Executive Officer of the Ministry is Minister of Foreign Affairs, who is member of the Cabinet and answers to the Prime Minister and the National Assembly. Current Minister of Foreign Affairs is Tanja Fajon of Social Democrats.

Minister is assisted by two State Secretaries, one of which is usually responsible for EU Affairs. Current State Secretaries are Gašper Dovžan (responsible for EU Affairs) and Stanislav Raščan (responsible for development and other affairs). While the one of the minister is a typical political position, State Secretaries are usually chosen among career diplomats within the ministry.

Internal service 
The ministry consists of the Minister's Cabinet, Secretariat and five political directorates. Head of Cabinet is Mihael Zupančič. Secretariat is headed by the Secretary-General Ambassador Jožef Drofenik.

Directorates and departments within them are:

 Directorate for Common Foreign and Security Policy (Director-General and Political Director Jernej Müller);
Department for Security Policy 
Department for Strategic Studies and Analyses 
Department for North and Latin America and the Caribbean 
Department for Africa and the Middle East 
Department for Asia and Oceania 
Department for Eastern Europe, South Caucasus, Central Asia and the Arctic 
Department for Enlargement and South-Eastern Europe 
Department for the Bled Strategic Forum 
 Directorate for European Union Affairs (Director-General Ambassador Barbara Sušnik);
Department for European Affairs
Department for European Countries
Department for General and Institutional Affairs
Department for Neighbouring Countries
 Directorate for Multilateral Affairs and Development Cooperation (Acting Director-General Igor Jukič);
Department for International Organisations
Human Rights Department
Department for Development Cooperation and Humanitarian Assistance
 Directorate for Economic and Public Diplomacy (Acting Director-General Slobodan Šešum); and
Department for Bilateral Economic Cooperation I 
Department for Bilateral Economic Cooperation II 
Department for Public Diplomacy and International Cooperation in Culture 
 Directorate for International Law and Protection of Interests (Director-General Marko Rakovec).
International Law Department
Diplomatic Protocol
Consular Department
Department for Borders and Succession Issues
Cabinet of the Minister consists of:

 Strategic communication Service
 Service for Cooperation with the Government and the National Assembly
 Internal Audit Service
 Diplomatic Supervisor
 Diplomatic academy

Secretariat consists of:

 Information Technology Service
 Personnel Service
 Accounting and Finance Service
 Documentation and Classified Information Service
 Legal Affairs And Public Procurement Service
 Property Management Service
 Logistics and Security Service

External service 
Slovenia operates several diplomatic representations and consular posts. There are 42 embassies (one of them non-residential), 7 permanent missions to international organizations, 5 Consulates General, 1 representative office and 3 consulates. Slovenia also has several honorary consuls.

Ministers

See also
Foreign relations of Slovenia

References

Government of Slovenia
Foreign Affairs
Slovenia
Foreign relations of Slovenia